Alejandro "Alex" Sosa is a fictional character and the main antagonist in the 1983 American crime film Scarface and the 2006 video game Scarface: The World Is Yours. He is an international Bolivian drug lord and the chief supplier of cocaine for his business partner Tony Montana. Only when Sosa was betrayed did his relationship with Tony Montana end. Sosa is portrayed by Paul Shenar in the film. He is based on the Bolivian drug lord Roberto Suárez Gómez.

Overview

Scarface (1983)

Alejandro Sosa is presented in the film as a Bolivian landowner, hailing from a rich family, educated in England and currently the business brain and drug overlord of an empire that stretches across the Andes region. He is immensely wealthy and has wide-reaching political and criminal connections, both in Latin America and in the United States. 

Frank Lopez (Robert Loggia) sends Tony Montana (Al Pacino) and Omar Suarez (F. Murray Abraham) to make a drug deal with Sosa who asks them to guarantee the buying of a certain amount of cocaine every month. After some issues, Montana promises Sosa to talk with Lopez about sharing the risk. When Sosa is informed that Suarez was previously a police informant, Suarez is beaten by Sosa's henchmen and then hanged to death from a helicopter, which Tony witnesses. Sosa gives immediate respect to Tony due to his honesty and straight-forward demeanor, even agreeing that Omar fooling Lopez "could happen to anyone". When Lopez hears of the developments, he refuses to believe that Omar was a "stoolie" and even suspects that Tony has some ulterior motives. Lopez and Tony separate after the argument and the latter proposes marriage to Lopez's girlfriend Elvira Hancock. When Lopez becomes aware of Tony's aspirations regarding Elvira, he sends two hit-men to have him killed. The plan backfires and Tony kills the two hit-men. Tony then goes to Lopez and has his right-hand-man Manny kill Lopez and a corrupt police detective after Lopez confesses to hiring the hitmen to kill Tony. Tony becomes a drug lord in Miami and for a while, enjoys a period of mutual business prosperity with Sosa.

When Tony Montana is arrested for tax evasion, Sosa offers to use his government contacts to keep Montana from going to prison. In exchange, Montana is to assassinate a journalist who is threatening to expose Sosa's illicit activities. Montana agrees and heads to New York City with Sosa's henchman Alberto "The Shadow", planning to detonate a bomb in the journalist's car. However, the journalist is unexpectedly accompanied by his wife and children, causing Montana to call off the hit. Shadow refuses and intends to detonate the bomb, causing Montana to shoot The Shadow in the head. Later, when Montana reaches his home, Sosa calls him angrily and inquires about the incident. Montana offends him and in retaliation the infuriated Sosa sends his assassins to Montana's home to finish him. Despite the casualties he inflicts, Montana is ultimately killed in the attack when Sosa's personal hitman "The Skull" sneaks up behind him, shoots Montana in the back with a double barrel shotgun, causing him to fall into the fountain with the symbolic "The World Is Yours" globe sign above it. This is notably similar to the final scene of the original Scarface film.

Scarface: The World Is Yours (2006)

In the 2006 action-adventure video game Scarface: The World is Yours, the ending of the film treatment was altered to establish that Tony won the climactic battle against Sosa's men, escaping before the police showed up, although Sosa had succeeded in ending Tony's drug empire. Tony quits using cocaine and the game focuses on Tony's efforts to rebuild his old drug empire on the ashes of his old one and to exact revenge upon Sosa.

Sosa is not seen (though his voice is heard through much of the game) until in the final mission where he held a meeting with Gaspar Gomez and George Sheffield regarding the fact that Tony has taken over all of Miami and is now after them. Montana confronts Sosa in his living room after killing Gomez and Sheffield, and wiping out Sosa's men in his mansion in Bolivia. Sosa tells Montana he warned him not to betray him, but Montana did, referring to the incident with the journalist in the film. Sosa says that in their business, sometimes children have to be killed, particularly so "heroes don't go on 60 Minutes", referring to the journalist who on national TV named him and many of his allies as reputed drug traffickers. Montana then executes Sosa by shooting him 30 times with an AK-47, unloading the entire magazine, leaving his bullet riddled corpse slumped against his couch. Tony Montana heads back to Miami, Florida where he proceeds to celebrate his control of the city's drug trade, Sosa's assassination, and the destruction of Sosa's drug empire.

Reception, influence and legacy
The character of Alejandro Sosa was well received. Complex has ranked Sosa as 27th in its list of 50 best villains in movie history. Rapper Pitbull said in 2014 that "I wanted to be Sosa – educated, good-looking, a good dresser". The song "Criminology" by Wu-Tang Clan rapper Raekwon,  from his debut album Only Built 4 Cuban Linx..., begins with a dialogue between Montana and Sosa where Sosa calls the former a "fucking little monkey". Rapper Chief Keef popularly goes by the nickname "Sosa" and he named his fifth child "Sno" meaning "The White Sosa". Montana's killing, ordered by Sosa, has been listed by Complex as the 1st one in its "Top 50 Movie Assassinations" list. The character Colonel Sanders in the South Park episode "Medicinal Fried Chicken" is similar to Sosa.

References

Further reading

External links
 Alejandro Sosa on IMDb

Fictional murdered people
Fictional Bolivian people
Fictional characters based on real people
Fictional murderers of children
Fictional criminals in films
Fictional Hispanic and Latino American people
Crime film characters
Scarface (1983 film)
Fictional drug dealers
Fictional crime bosses
Film characters introduced in 1983
Fictional mass murderers
Fictional gangsters
Fictional Hispanic and Latino American people in video games